
Prion Island is an island  north-northeast of Luck Point, lying in the Bay of Isles, South Georgia. It was charted in 1912-13 by Robert Cushman Murphy, American naturalist aboard the brig Daisy, and so named because he observed prions on the island.

The island has been designated as a Specially Protected Area by the South Georgia Government, due to its rat-free status and breeding wandering albatrosses. Access is by permit, in that the island must be specifically named on the visit application and permit. A boardwalk with two viewing platforms was built in February/March 2008 to prevent erosion of the access gully and trampling of prion burrows.  Wandering Albatross population counts are conducted annually.  Because it is rat-free it is a breeding area for South Georgia pipits and burrowing petrels.

Access
Visits are restricted as described in the GSGSSI Information For Visitors document as follows:
 Closed between 20 November and 7 January (Inclusive), to prevent disturbance of breeding fur seals at the landing beach.
 A maximum of two visits per day
 Landing at the designated beach only and all visitors to stay on the boardwalk
 Commercial visits to maintain a 1:10 staff to passenger ratio
 Maximum 50 people ashore at any time
 A visit is not to exceed 5 hours
 Thorough biosecurity checks to be made before landing

See also 
 List of Antarctic and sub-Antarctic islands
 Google Street View website Retrieved Jan 2017

References

External links
 Film of Prion Island
 GSGSSI Information for Visitors document

Islands of South Georgia
Seabird colonies